Ejnar Levison (15 May 1880 – 3 August 1970) was a Danish fencer. He competed at four Olympic Games.

References

1880 births
1970 deaths
Danish male fencers
Olympic fencers of Denmark
Fencers at the 1908 Summer Olympics
Fencers at the 1912 Summer Olympics
Fencers at the 1920 Summer Olympics
Fencers at the 1924 Summer Olympics
Sportspeople from Copenhagen